Luang Ta is a 1980 Thai film directed by Permphol Cheyaroon. It was entered into the 31st Berlin International Film Festival.

Cast
 Chatupol Bhuapirom
 Lotok
 Supansa Nuanbhirom

References

External links

1980 films
Thai drama films
Thai-language films
Thai national heritage films